Delphine Farmer is a Canadian chemist who is a professor at the Colorado State University. Her research considers the development of scientific instruments for atmospheric science. She was awarded the American Geophysical Union Atmospheric Sciences Ascent Award in 2022.

Early life and education 
Farmer grew up in Canada. Her father was an oceanographer, and she spent her childhood playing in his laboratory. She has credited her love of physics to a high school teacher, and her love of chemistry to an undergraduate lecturer. She was an undergraduate student at McGill University, and a postgraduate student at the University of California, Berkeley. During her doctoral studies, she spent a year in the Sierra Nevada, where she used mass spectrometry to understand the mountain air. Farmer then moved to the University of Colorado Boulder, where she spent a month in the Amazon rainforest.

Research and career 
In 2011, Farmer joined the Colorado State University. Farmer studies outdoor and indoor atmospheric chemistry. She looks to understand the sources and sinks of trace gases in the atmosphere. She spent 2014 as a Resident Fellow in the Colorado State University School of Global Environmental Sustainability.

Farmer studied the impact of wildfires on air quality. She used data from the Atmospheric Radiation Measurement Southern Great Plains observatory. She made her measurements using an ultra-high-sensitivity aerosol spectrometer The spectrometer uses a laser to determine the size of aerosol particles.

During the COVID-19 pandemic, Farmer studied the quality of indoor air.

Farmer was awarded the American Geophysical Union Atmospheric Sciences Ascent Award in 2022.

Selected publications

References

External links 
 

Living people
Canadian atmospheric scientists
Women atmospheric scientists
Colorado State University faculty
Academic staff of the University of Colima
McGill University Faculty of Science alumni
UC Berkeley College of Letters and Science alumni
Canadian emigrants to the United States
Year of birth missing (living people)
Atmospheric chemists